Haleysburg is an unincorporated community in Jefferson Township, Washington County, in the U.S. state of Indiana.

History
A post office was established at Haleysburg in 1883, and remained in operation until 1885. The community was named after the Haley family of settlers.

Geography

References

Unincorporated communities in Washington County, Indiana
Unincorporated communities in Indiana